Chahar Gulshan ("Four Gardens") is an 18th-century Persian language book about the history of India. It was written by Rai Chatar Man Kayath of Mughal empire in 1759 CE. It is also known as Akhbar-un Nawadir or Akhbaru-l-Nawadir ("Accounts of Rare Things").

Date and authorship 
The book was written by Rai Chatar Man Kayath, also known as Rai Chaturman Saksena Kayasth. The author was a Kayastha of the Saksinah (Saxena) clan. The preface states that the book was completed in 1173 A.H. (1759 CE), and was commissioned by Wazir Gazi-ud-din Khan.

Chahar Gulshan was completed only a week before the author's death. His grandson Rai Chandrabhan Raizadah re-arranged the content and added a second preface to the book in 1789. Raizada's copy is the earliest surviving manuscript (Bodleian 264), likely copied from the original.

Content 

The title of the book ("four gardens") refers to its four sections.

 Ahwal-i Padshahan-i Hindostan
 Description of the kings of Hindustan (northern India) from the legendary Yudhishthira to Shah Jahan II
 Information on provinces (subahs) of the Mughal Empire, except those in Deccan.
 Ayan-i subahjat-i junubistan
 Information on the provinces of the Deccan region
 Information on the Deccan Sultans
 Musafat-o manazil
 Road maps with distances and list of sarais (roadside inns)
 Topgraphy (Rivers, embankments, bridges and canals)
 Silasil fuqra‘-wa darveshan-i Hunud
 Description of dervishes and saints
 Largely based on Akhabar al-Akhiyar, but also contains some unique information on local saints

The book contains important statistical data, including total cultivated area, number of villages and mahal-wise revenue. However, these statistics are from a period earlier than the book's completion date, likely 1720 CE. By the time the book had been completed (1759 CE), the Mughal emperor was a figurehead. Ahmad Shah Durrani had captured Punjab. The Marathas had gained control of western Deccan and had crossed Narmada. Nizam-ul-Mulk Asaf Jah I, the Mughal viceroy of Deccan, had set up a practically independent state. The book itself states that statistics of Bijapur and Hyderabad are incomplete, as Asaf Jah I had carried away all the records.

Section 1: Hindustan 

The first gulshan contains information on the following provinces:

Section 2: Deccan 

The second gulshan contains information on the 6 provinces of Deccan:

This section also contains additional sub-sections on:

 Sultans of Deccan
 Forts of the Deccan provinces
 Saints of the Deccan provinces
 Hindu shrines, springs and rivers in Deccan

Section 3: Road book 

The third gulshan describes the 24 important roads connecting the main cities of the Mughal Empire:

Section 4 

The fourth gulshan describes "Hindu faqirs" (including the Sikh Gurus) and Muslim saints.

Writing style 

The Chahar Gulshan is a condensed book of history. Unlike the contemporary Persian-language works that featured flowerly language, it contains short and simple sentences. Jadunath Sarkar remarked that the book appears to be a "set of notes" rather than a finished treatise.

Translations and editio princeps 

A partial English translation of the book was published in Jadunath Sarkar's India of Aurangzib (1901). However, his translation has several statistical errors, because he misinterpreted the raqam notation used in the original work. In addition, Sarkar omitted several parts. For example:
 the "vague and rhetorical" details of fairs and amusements
 "dry and short" chronicles of kings
 chronicles that "disturbed the holy repose" of the saints (including the entire Section 4)

Muhammad Riazuddin Khan translated the work into Hindi (1990, Tonk). This work contained an editio princeps of the original manuscript, which was not annotated and edited.

In 2011, the National Mission for Manuscripts published a version annotated and edited by Chander Shekhar. This version was based on five manuscripts:

 National Museum New Delhi (1794)
 Khuda Bakhsh Oriental Library, Patna (1803)
 Salar Jung Museum, Hyderabad (1811)
 Maulana Azad Library, Aligarh (not dated)
 Maulana Abul Kalam Azad Arabic Persian Research, Tonk (not dated)

References

External links 
 Chahar Gulshan at Digital Library of India
 India of Aurangzib by Jadunath Sarkar; includes a partial translation of Chahar Gulshan

1758 books
18th-century Indian books
Books about the Mughal Empire
Persian-language books
Indian chronicles